Motu Pitiuu Uta, also known as Sofitel Motu,  is a  island in the Bora Bora Islands Group, within the Society Islands of French Polynesia. It is the located between Pitiuu Tai, and Matira Beach on the main island.

The island is the site of the Sofitel Bora Bora Private Island.

The nearest airport is Bora Bora Airport.

Administration
The island is part of Bora Bora Commune.

References

 
Private islands of French Polynesia